Proprioseiopsis catinus is a species of mite in the family Phytoseiidae.

References

catinus
Articles created by Qbugbot
Animals described in 1976